Sim Seung-seob (born January 28, 1963) is the 33rd Chief of Naval Operations for the Republic of Korea Navy. He was sworn in on July 18, 2019.

He was born in Jeonbuk Province and attended the Korea Naval Academy.  He previously held the position of Chief Directorate of Strategic Planning for the Joint Chiefs of Staff of the Republic of Korea and served as commander of the South Korean 1st Fleet. He holds the rank of Admiral.

See also
 History of the Republic of Korea Navy

References

External links
 

Chiefs of Naval Operations (South Korea)
Living people
1963 births